Héctor Núñez Segovia (born 15 April 1992) is a Paraguayan-born Chilean footballer who last played for Presidente Hayes in the Paraguayan Tercera División.

Career
On 12 February 2019, Núñez joined Estonian club Nõmme Kalju FC on a contract until the end of 2021. He left the club on 10 July 2019.

Personal life
Núñez was born in Asunción, Paraguay, to a Chilean father, Héctor, and a Paraguayan mother, Ada, who is the daughter of the Paraguayan former footballer and President of Cerro Porteño, Nelson Segovia González, deceased in 2013. As a baby, he came to Chile along with his family and has two sisters, Ivonne and Isabela.

References

External links
 
 
 
 Héctor Núñez at Memoria Wanderers 
 Héctor Núñez at playmakerstats.com (English version of ceroacero.es)

1992 births
Living people
Sportspeople from Asunción
Paraguayan footballers
Sportspeople of Chilean descent
Citizens of Chile through descent
Chilean people of Paraguayan descent
Chilean footballers
Chilean expatriate footballers
Association football forwards
Santiago Wanderers footballers
Unión La Calera footballers
Deportes Concepción (Chile) footballers
WSG Tirol players
San Antonio Unido footballers
Cobán Imperial players
Club Presidente Hayes footballers
Nõmme Kalju FC players
General Díaz footballers
Chilean Primera División players
Primera B de Chile players
Austrian Regionalliga players
Segunda División Profesional de Chile players
Liga Nacional de Fútbol de Guatemala players
Paraguayan Cuarta División players
Paraguayan Tercera División players
Meistriliiga players
Paraguayan Primera División players
Naturalized citizens of Chile
Chilean expatriate sportspeople in Austria
Chilean expatriate sportspeople in Guatemala
Chilean expatriate sportspeople in Paraguay
Chilean expatriate sportspeople in Estonia
Expatriate footballers in Austria
Expatriate footballers in Guatemala
Expatriate footballers in Paraguay
Expatriate footballers in Estonia